Demoniak  is a character of Italian comics born in the wake of the success of Diabolik and protagonist of three homonymous comic series published in Italy from 1965 to 1973. The character was created by Furio Arrasich and designed by Franco Verola and Edoardo Morricone. Although there are many similarities with Diabolik with whom he shares in addition to the physicality and the presence of a companion also called Eva, the story has a very different layout, with settings bordering on magic and parapsychology.

References 

Italian comics titles
Italian comics characters
1965 comics debuts
Comics characters introduced in 1965
Fictional Italian people
Italian comics
Crime comics
Fictional professional thieves
Comic book digests